The Cass County Dentzel Carousel, formerly known as the Spencer Park Dentzel Carousel and also known as the Riverside Park Dentzel Carousel or Logansport Carousel, is a historic carousel in Riverside Park of Logansport, Indiana.  Built by the Dentzel Carousel Company, probably by 1900, it is one of the company's oldest surviving menagerie-style carousels, with animals likely hand-carved by George Dentzel.  It was declared a National Historic Landmark in 1987.

Description and history
The carousel is now located in the playground area of Logansport's Riverside Park, in a utilitarian multisided building. The animals depicted include deer, giraffes, a lion and a tiger, and a variety of horses. There are four two-seat chariots. The carousel includes its original mechanism for dispensing rings, in which the recipient of the brass ring is awarded a free ride. The organ and power plant (electric now, but originally steam) are of uncertain provenance, and may not be original.

The exact construction date of the carousel is not known.  It has been estimated to have been built c. 1900-1903, but may be older.  It was apparently built for the Fort Wayne Consolidated Railway Company, which operated Robison Park, an amusement park outside Fort Wayne.  The park closed in 1919, and the carousel was then moved to Logansport, where it operated in Spencer Park for many years.  In 1949 it was moved to Riverside Park, and in 1972 it was purchased by the non-profit Cass County Carousel. In 1993 it underwent a complete restoration, in which its original paint job was restored.

Two other existing Dentzel Carousel Company carousels are also declared National Historic Landmarks.  The Highland Park Dentzel Carousel and Shelter Building survives in Mississippi and the Broad Ripple Park Carousel is in Indianapolis.

References

External links

Carousels on the National Register of Historic Places in Indiana
National Historic Landmarks in Indiana
Tourist attractions in Cass County, Indiana
Amusement rides introduced in 1919
Buildings and structures in Cass County, Indiana
National Register of Historic Places in Cass County, Indiana
Logansport, Indiana